Bacoachi is a small town in Bacoachi Municipality in the north of the Mexican state of Sonora.  The area of the municipality is 487 square miles (1,260.65 km²) and the population (rural and urban) was 1,456 in 2005, with 924 inhabitants residing in the municipal seat.  The elevation of the municipal seat is 4,429 feet (1,350 meters) above sea level.

Bacoachi is located southeast of Cananea and has boundaries in the north with Naco, in the east with Fronteras, in the southeast with Nacozari, in the southwest with Arizpe and in the east with Cananea.

The territory was originally inhabited by the Opata Teguima Indians, who called their settlement "Cuchibaciachi".  In 1649, Captain Simón Lazo de la Vega founded a Spanish town in the same spot.  The name means "water snake" in the indigenous language.

Most of the land is mountainous and is part of the Sierra de Sonora.  There are still pine forests and a rich variety of fauna, including coyotes, jaguars, deer, raccoons, wild pigs, skunks, and owls, among others.

The population has been decreasing due to immigration to the United States of America.

There are few roads but the municipality is connected to the capital, Hermosillo, by the Hermosillo-Cananea highway.

Agriculture and cattle raising are the main economic activities.  Most of the agriculture is involved in growing grasses for the cattle, which numbered over 25,000 head in 2000.

Sources consulted
INEGI
Enciclopedia de los Municipios de Mexico

External links
Bacoachi, Ayuntamiento Digital (Official Website of Bacoachi, Sonora)

Populated places in Sonora
Populated places established in 1649